This is a listing of official releases by Roll Deep, a MOBO Award-nominated London-based grime music collective. Their debut album, In at the Deep End, was released in June 2005. Four singles were released from the album: "Heat Up", "The Avenue", "When I'm 'Ere" and "Shake a Leg". Roll Deep Recordings is their own record label, which they use to distribute their mixtapes.

Their second album Rules and Regulations was released in 2007, followed by the release of Return Of The Big Money Sound in 2008. Current member Wiley and former members Dizzee Rascal and Tinchy Stryder have gone on to be successful solo artists in the UK and even the U.S., with songs that have topped charts. The group got their first UK number 1 single with the song "Good Times" in May 2010 and the group's second UK number 1 single was "Green Light" in August 2010. Their next single was "Take Control", featuring R&B singer Alesha Dixon, which charted at number 29 on 7 November 2010.

Albums

Studio albums

Compilations
 Street Anthems (2009) (Roll Deep Recordings)

Mixtapes
2004: Creeper, Vol. 1
2004: Creeper, Vol. 2
2006: Presents Grimey Vol. 1
2010: Say No More
2012: No Comment Star

Singles

Other singles

Guest appearances

Music videos

References

Footnotes

Sources

Discographies of British artists